(Praise God! Now the year comes to an end), BWV28, is a church cantata by Johann Sebastian Bach for the Sunday after Christmas. He first performed it on 30 December 1725.

History and text 

The prescribed readings for the Sunday were from the Epistle to the Galatians, through Christ we are free from the law, and from the Gospel of Luke, Simeon and Anna talking to Mary.

The cantata text is by Erdmann Neumeister: he included in the second movement the first stanza of Johann Gramann's hymn "" (1530), a Bible quotation in the third movement, and a hymn stanza by Paul Eber for the closing chorale. The chorale theme "" (Zahn 5267) is of unknown authorship. The poet did not refer to the Bible readings for the day but portrayed thanks for the past year and prayers for preservation in the new year.

Bach first performed the cantata on 30 December 1725.

Structure and scoring 
Bach structured the cantata in six movements, scored for four vocal soloists (soprano, alto, tenor, bass) and four-part choir, and an Baroque instrumental ensemble of cornetto, three trombones, two oboes, taille, two violins, viola and continuo.

Music 
The cantata opens with an oboe trio playing an Italianate ritornello of four phrases, accompanied by the strings; the roles of the two choirs are later reversed. The soprano sings a virtuosic and melismatic aria commanding the listener to praise God.

The following chorale expands the command from the individual to the collective, adopting an "archaic" motet form. It is reminiscent of the movements which opened most of Bach's chorale cantatas, composed as a cycle the previous year. The cantus firmus is sung in long notes by the soprano while the lower voices add "skilful imitatory texture, partly from new themes and partly from ideas derived from the chorale line in question", as Klaus Hofmann notes. The instruments play colla parte in motet style with the voices, doubled by a quartet of cornetto and trombones. The music in stile antico was performed at the end of John Eliot Gardiner's Bach Cantata Pilgrimage in 2000, who described its "sobriety and complexity, its buried treasures and subtleties, especially those that occur in its last fifty bars, in which you sense some immense cosmic struggle being played out".

The third movement, a bass arioso, repeats the ascending scalar motif of the chorus. The tenor recitative is accompanied by sustained chordal strings and concludes on a major harmony. The continuo opens the duet aria with a two-part ritornello – dancing eighth notes followed by fast arpeggiated figures – that is repeated three more times during this movement. The vocal lines sing three blocks of imitative motivic entries. In the style of Italian chamber duets, the voices first render a thought in imitation, "coming together each time for a concluding cadence".

The cantata concludes with a four-part chorale in A minor. Gardiner, who had conducted several versions during the Pilgrimage, notes the moving power of this harmonisation of the "prayer for protection and sustenance in the year to come".

Recordings 
 Amsterdam Baroque Orchestra & Choir, Ton Koopman. J. S. Bach: Complete Cantatas Vol. 15. Antoine Marchand 2001.
 Bach Collegium Japan, Masaaki Suzuki. J. S. Bach: Cantatas Vol. 28 – Cantatas from Leipzig 1724. BIS 2007.
 Gächinger Kantorei, Bach-Collegium Stuttgart, Helmuth Rilling. Die Bach Kantate Vol. 59. Hänssler 1982.
 Heinrich-Schütz-Chor Heilbronn, Pforzheim Chamber Orchestra, Fritz Werner. Les Grandes Cantates de J.S. Bach Vol. 10. Erato 1965.
 Holland Boys Choir, Netherlands Bach Collegium, Pieter Jan Leusink. Bach Edition Vol. 11 – Cantatas Vol. 5. Brilliant Classics 2000.
 Monteverdi Choir, English Baroque Soloists, John Eliot Gardiner. Bach Cantatas Vol. 19: Greenwich/Romsey. Soli Deo Gloria 2000.
 Münchener Bach-Chor, Münchener Bach-Orchester, Karl Richter. J. S. Bach: Kantatan/Cantatas BWV 80, BWV 26, BWV 116. Archiv Produktion 1972.
 Wiener Sängerknaben, Chorus Viennensis, Concentus Musicus Wien, Nikolaus Harnoncourt. J. S. Bach: Das Kantatenwerk – Sacred Cantatas Vol. 2. Teldec 1974.

Notes

References

Cited sources

External links 
 
 Cantata BWV 28 Bach Cantatas Website
 Luke Dahn: BWV 28.6 bach-chorales.com

Church cantatas by Johann Sebastian Bach
1725 compositions